Qassab, in Iran, may refer to:

Qassab, Bushehr
Qassab, South Khorasan